Nevel Lourdes Sacramento Gracias (11 February 1964 – 13 May 2022), popularly known as Fr. Nevel Gracias, was an Indian actor, singer, composer, director, playwright, editor and diocesan priest from Goa. He predominantly worked on the Konkani stage and is best known for his lenten tiatrs. He was regarded as a one-man show and served in the general council of the Tiatr Academy of Goa.

Early and personal life
Nevel Gracias was born in Naik-Caiero, Velim. He completed his primary and high school education at St. Francis Xavier High School, Velim. He later graduated from Damodar College of Commerce, Margao. 

Gracias had one of his leg below the knee amputated due to diabetes in 2006 and was bedridden at Goa Medical College in Bambolim, however ensured that his lenten tiatrs saw the light of the day.

Career

Priesthood
Gracias was described as a diligent altar server who aspired to be a priest. He joined at Rachol Seminary in June 1984. Through his years at the seminary his love for tiatrs and volleyball persisted. He was ordained as a priest on 30 April 1991 at St Francis Xavier’s Church in Velim by then, Archbishop Emeritus Raul Nicolau Gonçalves. He served as an assistant to parish priest at the parishes of Taleigao and Piedade in Divar. 
 
In 1996, he was appointed as an assistant parish priest of Loutolim and later went on to be the Spiritual director of the Legion of Mary of Loutolim Curia. Gracias was assigned as the Parochial administrator of the Parish of Chaudi in Canacona in 1999. He was then made the Spiritual director of the Legion of Mary of Canacona Curia, within a year of his service he was appointed as the parish priest. In 2004 he was assigned as the Dean of Canacona deanery.
 
In 2006, Gracias was appointed as the parish priest of Our Lady of Lourdes Church, Utorda but within a year, he was summoned back due to his health issues. In 2007, he was promoted to Assistant director of Lar de Santa Terezinha, two years later in 2009 he was appointed as an Assistant director of the Diocesan Catechetical Center and then later as a Director of Lay apostolate, where he was an editor for religious bi-monthly booklets, Jivitacho Prokas and Daily Flash, that included daily reflections on the word of God. Gracias also served in the parishes of Tivim, Panjim and Caranzalem. 
 
In 2014, Gracias was then assigned to St. Diogo Parish in Guirim-Sangolda, but due to his declining health he was summoned back in 2018. He was then sent to a clergy home, at Casa Urbina in Porvorim and resided there till his death.

Tiatrs

Gracias had a keen interest for tiatrs since the young age of 9. He didn't have a smooth start at his initial career on the Konkani stage but would keep up a positive zeal. He wrote the script for his first tiatr, "Ek rukachim tin follam" at the age of 12 in 1976, it didn't help him succeed as he had to face many hardships but it didn't let his love for tiatrs die down. He took part at a local seniors auditions that were selecting casts and singers for a village tiatr. He went on to perform many traditional songs.
 
Unfortunately young Gracias couldn't secure a spot for himself at the auditions and was never told why he was rejected. This didn't let him down, on the contrary he continued with his work, showcasing tiatrs in a distinguished and unique perspective. Gracias initially chose the Konkani stage as a medium to spread the word of God. He didn't intend to start out his tiatrs based on lenten or having religious concepts, instead his initial tiatrs storylines were based on family values, women’s liberation, patriotism, and social life. 
 
Since 1997 Gracias started with his lenten plays that drew mass attention mainly at the village church squares during the 43 days lenten season. He presented all of these tiatrs under the "Vell’lekar Nirmiti" banner and shared little of his profits to charity. Prior to his death, he told Times of India that "the tiatr medium is more impactful than preaching", as it helps convey a strong message to mass audiences since it's a visual form of art, it's more effective.
 
In a career span of more than 45 years as a dramatist, Gracias has wrote and staged about 47 tiatrs and 24 lenten plays. His last show, "Tim Dogaim Ek Zatolim" was staged just before the Covid-19 pandemic, two years later in 2022, the same production was rescheduled in villages and completed 25 shows. "Mhaka Nitoll Kor", his silver jubilee show was scheduled in the next lent season in 2023 which included noted tiatrist, Prince Jacob in a stiff role.

On 6 January 2009, Gracias was nominated as the council member of Tiatr Academy of Goa. He was a script judge at the Kala Academy’s 42nd tiatr ‘A’ group competition. He was also a regular contributor in writing for articles, Vauraddeancho Ixtt, Dor Mhoineachi Rotti, Gulab and Renovacao. Until his death in 2022, Gracias has composed over 300 songs that were featured in his lenten plays. He has also published a book, Goychem Kantar (Konknni Kantaram), which includes 354 songs of various categories, lyrics were written by Gracias and music done by Nolvert Cota.

Filmography

Tiatrs

Awards
In July 2013, Gracias was awarded the "Gulab Award" as the Best director for his work in "Taka Khursar Mar" in the tiatr category. The same year he was the recipient of "Maria Afonso Konknni Puroskar" for his contributions in the Romi Konkani language. 
 
In 2020, Gracias was awarded the "Gulab Award" as the Gulab writer of the year.

In 2021, he was awarded the "Dalgado Konkani Academy Award" for the year 2020 in the cultural category.

Death
Gracias ailing to his health died in his sleep at the clergy home, Casa Urbina in Porvorim at the age of 58.

Reactions
Mario Menezes, a notable tiatr director expressed his condolences via a social media post and wrote that he was sad and shocked to hear the news of Gracias's sudden demise and further stated that he was a great priest, actor, singer, composer, writer and director, a great friend and advisor.

Rupesh Jogle, who played the role as an acting director while Gracias was bedridden said that one of Gracias's special traits was that he would work with a small troupe of 8 artists and get them do everything from biblical scenes, songs and regular roles. He also states that Gracias managed the tiatr so well that none of his cast felt any burden while working with him.

References

External links
 Nevel Gracias at Tiatr.in
 Nevel Gracias at Goan Churches 
 Funeral service of Fr. Nevel Gracias
 Nevel Gracias at St. Diogo Church, Guirim
 General Council of Establishment in 2009

1964 births
2022 deaths
Indian Roman Catholic priests
Indian dramatists and playwrights
Goan people
Indian male actors
Indian theatre directors
Indian producers
Indian male singers
People from South Goa district
21st-century Indian composers